Sprengelia propinqua is a species of flowering plant of the family Ericaceae, and is endemic to Tasmania. It is an erect, robust shrub with overlapping, stem-clasping, egg-shaped leaves, and white flowers crowded in upper leaf axils.

Description
Flowering occurs from November to January.

Taxonomy
Sprengelia propinqua was first formally described in 1839 by Augustin Pyramus de Candolle in his Prodromus Systematis Naturalis Regni Vegetabilis from an unpublished description by Allan Cunningham of plants he collected near Hobart. The specific epithet (propinqua) means "resembling".

Habitat and distribution
This sprengelia grows in heath and sedge communities in high rainfall areas from sea level to altitudes above  in Tasmania, including on the Southern and Central Highlands. It often co-exists with Sprengelia incarnata, and sometimes hybridises with it.

References

Epacridoideae
propinqua
Ericales of Australia
Flora of Tasmania
Plants described in 1839
Taxa named by Alphonse Pyramus de Candolle